Mr. Tom is a candy bar containing roasted peanuts and caramel. Its wrapper has a yellow background and red text. It is manufactured by Hosta Meltis, a division of Swiss company Hosta International.

Mr. Tom sponsored the Sheffield Wednesday shirts during the 1991-1992 season.

From 2014 to 2018, the brand was the shirt sponsor of Newport County football club.

See also
 List of confectionery brands

References

External links

Candy bars
Brand name confectionery